Xanthodaphne cladara is a species of sea snail, a marine gastropod mollusk in the family Raphitomidae.

Distribution
This marine species occurs off Eastern Indonesia.

References

 Sysoev, A., 1997. Mollusca Gastropoda: New deep-water turrid gastropods (Conoidea) from eastern Indonesia. Mémoires du Muséum national d'Histoire naturelle 172: 325-355

External links
 MNHN, Paris: holotype
 

cladara
Gastropods described in 1997